Dame Te Atairangikaahu  (23 July 1931 – 15 August 2006) was the Māori queen for 40 years, the longest reign of any Māori monarch. Her full name and title was Te Arikinui Dame Te Atairangikaahu. Her title Te Arikinui (meaning Paramount Chief) and name Te Atairangikaahu (meaning the hawk of the morning sky) were bestowed when she became monarch; previously she was known as Princess Piki Mahuta and, after marriage, Princess Piki Paki.

Life
She was born to the name Pikimene Korokī Mahuta within the marriage of Korokī Mahuta and Te Atairangikaahu Hērangi; Koroki Mahuta fathered older daughters, Tuura the younger of two, both by Tepaia an earlier relationship. Te Atairangikaahu had adopted siblings including Sir Robert Mahuta, whose daughter Nanaia Mahuta served as a member of Parliament, customs minister, and in 2020 serves as foreign minister in Jacinda Ardern's cabinet. She was a descendant of the first Māori king, Pōtatau Te Wherowhero, and succeeded, King Korokī, becoming queen the day Korokī was buried. She attended Rakaumanga Primary School and Waikato Diocesan School for Girls.

In 1952, she married Whatumoana Paki, whose father was from Waikato tribe Ngāti Whāwhākia and mother from the northern tribe of Te Aupōuri. They had seven children: Tuheitia Paki, Heeni Katipa (née Paki), Tomairangi Paki, Kiki Solomon (née Paki), Mihi Gabrielle Paki, Maharaia Paki, and Te Manawanui Clarkson (née Paki).

In the 1970 New Year Honours, Te Atairangikaahu was the first Māori to be appointed a Dame Commander of the Order of the British Empire, "for outstanding services to the Māori people". On 6 February 1987, Te Atairangikaahu was the first appointee to the Order of New Zealand. and her badge of the order bears the number 1. She was awarded an honorary doctorate from Waikato University in 1973, and an Honorary Doctor of Laws from Victoria University in 1999. In 1986 she was appointed an Officer of the Order of St John. She was awarded the New Zealand 1990 Commemoration Medal, and in 1993, she was awarded the New Zealand Suffrage Centennial Medal.

In December 2005, she started dialysis treatment when her kidneys began to fail. On 11 July 2006, she suffered what appeared to be a heart attack, and was admitted to intensive care in Waikato Hospital, Hamilton. She was discharged from hospital later in the month, in time to celebrate her 75th birthday.

Death
Te Arikinui Dame Te Atairangikaahu died on 15 August 2006, aged 75, at her official residence, Turangawaewae Marae in Ngāruawāhia. Six of her seven children were present, with one daughter en route from Australia.

Her death sparked a week of mourning for Māoridom leading to her funeral on 21 August 2006. She is buried on Taupiri mountain in an unmarked grave, as are her ancestors, as a sign of equality with their people. Queen Elizabeth II sent her condolences.

Her widower, Whatumoana Paki, had wanted a tombstone for his wife, but members of the royal family do not have grave markings. Instead, Paki paid tribute to his wife by planting a breed of purple roses, named specifically for Te Atairangikaahu, around a memorial stone outside their home.

Reign

Although the office of the Māori monarch holds no constitutional function, it is the paramount head of the Waikato federation of tribes with its parliament. In addition to this Te Atairangikaahu was an avid supporter of Māori cultural and sporting events and played an active role in local and global political events involving indigenous issues.

Her official residence was Turongo House in the Turangawaewae Marae complex coupled with Mahinarangi (official reception room for receiving dignitaries) and Raukawa iti (official guest house).  She and her husband also resided at Waahi Pa in Huntly during her reign. He continued to live at their residence with his son until his death in 2011.

Succession
Tuheitia Paki, her eldest son, was chosen during the mourning period as her successor with the help of a "kingmaker", after the consent of the chiefs of all the leading tribes was sought. Her eldest child, daughter Heeni Katipa, was the next leading contender for the position.

In contrast to the Monarchy of New Zealand, the Māori monarchy is both elective and operates outside New Zealand's constitutional structures. Consequently, the position is not automatically inherited by primogeniture as the New Zealand throne is. Te Atairangikaahu herself was her father's second daughter, though the eldest was not born to his wife, so any of her children or a leading figure from another iwi could have been appointed.

References

External links

 Biography 
 The Māori King Movement (NZHistory.net.nz)
 1986 Honours List

1931 births
2006 deaths
Māori monarchs
New Zealand Dames Commander of the Order of the British Empire
Members of the Order of New Zealand
Officers of the Order of St John
People from Huntly, New Zealand
Deaths from kidney failure
People educated at Waikato Diocesan School
Recipients of the New Zealand Suffrage Centennial Medal 1993
20th-century women rulers
People of the Māori Women's Welfare League
20th-century monarchs in Oceania
21st-century monarchs